) is a retired professional sumo wrestler (rikishi) from Ulaanbaatar, Mongolia. Making his debut in March 2001, he reached the top makuuchi division in May 2004. In May 2007, at the age of 22, he became the second native of Mongolia, and the fourth non-Japanese overall, to be promoted to the highest rank in sumo, yokozuna.

In 2009, he broke the record for the most wins in a calendar year, winning 86 out of 90 bouts, and repeated this feat with the same record again in 2010 when he established the second longest winning streak in sumo history. He also holds the record for the most undefeated tournament championships at sixteen, which is eight more than any other sumo wrestler in history.

He was the only active yokozuna from 2010, following the retirement of his rival and fellow Mongolian Asashōryū, until 2012 with the promotion of fellow Mongolian Harumafuji. In March 2021, he became the only active yokozuna once again following the retirement of his rival and fellow Mongolian Kakuryū until the promotion of fellow Mongolian Terunofuji 4 months later.

In January 2015, he broke Taihō's long-standing record by winning his 33rd top division championship, the most in the history of sumo. He holds the records for most wins in the top division, achieved in May 2016, and most career wins, achieved in July 2017. He was the longest-serving yokozuna of all-time, having surpassed Haguroyama's record in 2019, and fought his 1000th bout as a yokozuna in July 2020. He acquired Japanese citizenship in 2019.

Hakuhō retired from professional sumo at the end of September 2021, closing out a 20-year career in the sport. Sumo commentator John Gunning noted that Hakuhō left an unmatchable legacy, while a columnist for the Washington Post called him the "greatest figure in sports, maybe ever."

Early life and sumo background
Like many of his countrymen in professional sumo, Hakuhō belongs to a family in the Mongolian wrestling tradition. His father Jigjidiin Mönkhbat won a silver medal in freestyle wrestling at the 1968 Summer Olympics, his country's first ever Olympic medal, and held the highest ranking in Mongolian wrestling, "Darkhan Avarga" (meaning "Undisputed Champion"), which is the Mongolian equivalent of yokozuna. Davaajargal did not however have any formal training in Mongolian wrestling himself, as his father wished him to try other sports, and he concentrated on basketball as a child instead. However, at an early age he would be seen reading sumo magazines, and when his father asked him why he liked sumo so much, he responded by saying he wanted to be as big as a sumo wrestler one day. At that time he was considered below average in size.

He went to Japan in October 2000 when he was fifteen years old, invited by pioneering Mongolian wrestler Kyokushūzan. Because he weighed only , no sumo training stable (heya) was prepared to accept him. Hearing this, Kyokushūzan asked heya master Miyagino-oyakata to intercede, and Davaajargal was accepted to Miyagino stable on the last day of his two-month stay in Japan, 24 December 2000. He was given the ring name (shikona) Hakuhō, with haku meaning "white" and hō, meaning the Chinese mythological bird Peng. His shikona also emulates that of former yokozuna Taihō.

Hakuhō made his professional debut at the March tournament (honbasho) in Osaka in 2001 despite having no previous wrestling experience. His weight increased steadily as he rose in the ranks reaching the second highest jūryō division in January 2004, and the top makuuchi division in May of the same year. In his very first top-division tournament, he scored twelve wins against three losses and was awarded a special prize (sanshō) for Fighting Spirit. He also enjoyed great success in subsequent tournaments, winning a gold star (kinboshi) for defeating yokozuna Asashōryū in November 2004 while still at the lowest makuuchi rank of maegashira. This tournament also saw him finish as runner-up for the first time. He achieved a rapid promotion to the rank of komusubi in January 2005 and sekiwake only one tournament later. His progress was delayed by an injury which forced him to take leave (zen-kyu) from the Nagoya tournament in 2005.

His ōzeki promotion came in March 2006 after a 13–2 record, which included a playoff for the championship (which he lost to Asashōryū) and also earned him two special prizes for Outstanding Performance and Technique. This gave him a three tournament record of 35 wins against ten losses. His promotion was confirmed just a few weeks after his twenty-first birthday, making him the fourth youngest wrestler to reach ōzeki in modern sumo history.

Ōzeki
At his first tournament as ōzeki in May 2006, with Asashōryū absent, Hakuhō won his first championship (yūshō) with a 14–1 record, defeating Miyabiyama in another playoff. After another strong performance (13–2) in July, in which he finished as runner-up to Asashōryū and defeated him on the final day, Hakuhō was denied  promotion to yokozuna, despite the Japan Sumo Association's chairman Kitanoumi saying before the tournament that he would be considered if he posted 13 wins. Hakuhō told an interviewer that he had expected to be promoted. An uncharacteristically poor 8–7 showing in September put an end to any immediate promotion hopes. An injury sustained in training prevented him from participating in the November tournament, putting him at risk for demotion (kadoban) in January 2007, when he scored a respectable ten wins on his return to the ring.

Promotion to yokozuna

In March 2007 Hakuhō won his second championship in Osaka and a third championship in the very next tournament in May, with a perfect 15–0 (zenshō) record. Winning two consecutive championships satisfies the de facto requirements for promotion to the top rank in sumo. On the day following the tournament, the Yokozuna Deliberation Council unanimously recommended his promotion to yokozuna which was formally announced by the Japan Sumo Association on 30 May 2007. He had become yokozuna at the age of 22 years and two months – only Kitanoumi and Taihō had been younger when they were promoted. He performed his inaugural ring-entering ceremony (dohyō-iri) at the Meiji Shrine (in the lesser-used Shiranui style) on 1 June. He performed the ceremony at the Kokugikan during Kyokushūzan's retirement ceremony (danpatsu-shiki) on 2 June.

Yokozuna

2007
Hakuhō's first tournament as a yokozuna was in July 2007. His 25 match winning streak was brought to an end by Kotomitsuki on the 10th day, and further losses to Kotoōshū and Chiyotaikai put him out of contention for the title. He finished the tournament with an 11–4 record.

Hakuhō's first tournament championship as a yokozuna came in September 2007 with a 13–2 record, triumphing over Chiyotaikai on the last day. His second title as a yokozuna, and fifth overall, came in the following tournament in November with a 12–3 score. He lost to Kotomitsuki on the final day but the championship had already been decided earlier in the day when his only challenger Chiyotaikai pulled out through injury. His yokozuna rival Asashōryū missed both these tournaments through suspension.

2008
In the January 2008 tournament, he faced the returning Asashōryū on the final day with both wrestlers having a 13–1 score. In a bout lasting nearly a minute, Hakuhō defeated Asashōryū, winning his 6th championship with a 14–1 record. In the March 2008 tournament the two yokozuna met once again to decide the title and this time Asashōryū got his revenge, with Hakuhō finishing as runner-up.

In the May 2008 tournament, he won his first nine consecutive bouts. On the 10th day, however, he lost to Ama for the fourth time in their last five meetings, injuring his ankle in the process. Subsequent losses to Kotoōshū (the eventual winner of the tournament) and Kotomitsuki put him out of contention for the championship. He finished on 11–4, losing to Asashōryū on the final day in a match that sparked scandal after the two yokozuna nearly came to blows when Asashōryū gave Hakuhō an extra shove after the bout was over. Both wrestlers were given a warning over their conduct by the Japan Sumo Association.

In July 2008, with Asashōryū pulling out through injury he won his seventh championship without a serious challenge, securing victory by the 13th day: the first time this had been achieved since January 2005. He finished the tournament unbeaten; his second zenshō-yūshō. Although he lost on day five of the September tournament, he still dominated all other opponents and secured another championship on the 14th day. He finished the tournament with a 14–1 record.

In the November tournament Hakuhō was once again the sole yokozuna participating. He lost his opening bout to Aminishiki and his 12th day bout to Ama. Both Hakuhō and Ama finished with a 13–2 record and the eventual play-off was won by Hakuhō, handing him his fourth yūshō of the season and ninth in total.

2009

In the January 2009 tournament Hakuhō defeated Asashōryū on the final day in their first meeting since May, handing his fellow yokozuna his first defeat of the tournament and leaving both men with identical 14–1 records. Hakuhō was however beaten in the subsequent playoff. Hakuhō defeated Asashōryū again in the March tournament, this time capping off an undefeated 15–0 championship, his third zenshō-yūshō and his tenth championship overall.

In May he extended his winning run to 33 regulation bouts, the best since Asashōryū's 35 in 2004, until he was defeated by Kotoōshū on Day 14. He recovered to beat Asashōryū on Day 15 to finish at 14–1, but he lost the playoff bout to Harumafuji who claimed his first championship.

In July he won his eleventh championship, finishing one win ahead of Kotoōshū with another 14–1 score. He almost pulled off his twelfth championship in the following September tournament. One win behind Asashōryū for most of the tournament after giving away his first kinboshi in a year (to Shōtenrō) he forced a playoff by beating his rival on the final day, but then lost in the succeeding playoff bout. This was a very similar scenario to his loss to Asashōryū in the preceding January tournament. Regardless of this loss, he still managed to become the first makuuchi wrestler ever to win fourteen or more bouts in five consecutive tournaments. He also became the first wrestler ever to lose three makuuchi playoffs in one year. After the tournament he was diagnosed with ligament damage in his left elbow; however surgery was not required.

On 28 November, the fourteenth day of the Kyushu basho, he clinched his twelfth tournament championship and broke Asashōryū's 2005 record for most bouts won in a calendar year, which had stood at 84. He defeated Asashōryū the following day to secure his fourth career zenshō-yūshō and set his 2009 record total at 86 wins. This was also his fourteenth consecutive yūshō or jun-yūshō (winner or runner-up) performance, another record.

2010
In the opening tournament of the year Hakuhō's 30 bout winning streak was ended by Baruto on Day 7, and he suffered consecutive losses to ozeki Harumafuji and Kaiō on Days 12 and 13 to concede the title to Asashōryū by Day 14. He gained some consolation by beating his yokozuna rival for the seventh straight time in regulation bouts on the final day to finish the tournament on 12–3.

Hakuhō expressed his shock at the retirement of Asashōryū in February, following allegations his fellow yokozuna had assaulted a man in a drunken brawl outside a nightclub during the previous tournament. Fighting back tears he said, "I don't want to believe it. I was honoured to wrestle in the same era as him." After getting regularly beaten by Asashōryū earlier in his career, Hakuhō came to completely dominate him, winning all of their last seven regulation matches (excluding two tournament-playoff defeats) and finishing with a 14–13 record over his greatest rival.

He won the Osaka tournament in March with a perfect 15–0 record, his fifth undefeated score and thirteenth championship overall. After his victory he spoke of the extra pressure now that he was sumo's lone yokozuna and his relief at the win.

Hakuhō wrapped up his fourteenth championship in May by Day 13 (his earliest yūshō win since July 2008) and went on to record his sixth zenshō-yūshō, the first time he has achieved this in consecutive tournaments. With the win, he equalled the number of yūshō won by yokozuna Wajima, and to commemorate this he switched to wearing Wajima's trademark gold coloured mawashi.

In July 2010 a special committee reviewing the extent of illegal gambling within sumo revealed that Hakuhō had bet several tens of thousands of yen on hanafuda Japanese card games with his fellow wrestlers twice a year or so. However, the committee said that he would not be punished as it was not considered a serious offence. He nonetheless appeared along with nearly 80 other wrestlers at a press conference and apologised to sumo fans for his actions. On the 14th day of the Nagoya tournament he won his 46th consecutive bout, surpassing Taihō's 45, behind only Chiyonofuji's 53 and Futabayama's 69 as the longest winning run since the beginning of the Shōwa era. He clinched his fifteenth yūshō on the same day, and on the final day he secured his third consecutive 15–0 record, the first wrestler ever to achieve this. However, he did not receive the Emperor's Cup or any other trophy, as the Sumo Association decided to withdraw them in response to the gambling scandal. Hakuhō commented, "I hope we will not have a tournament like this ever again."

On Day 6 of the Aki basho in September he equalled the 53-bout winning streak of Chiyonofuji with a win over Kotoshōgiku, and surpassed it the following day by pushing out Kisenosato in front of the first sell-out crowd of the tournament so far. He said afterwards that he felt "I really repaid my debt of gratitude" to the former Chiyonofuji. He secured his fourth consecutive yūshō on the fourteenth day when rank-and-filers Yoshikaze and Takekaze suffered defeats, and he moved to 14–0 (and 61 consecutive wins) by beating Kotoōshū. Asked about Futabayama's record of 69 wins, set in the two tournament a year era from 1936 to 1939, he responded, "It is truly amazing that he was able to continue winning for almost three years." Former Sumo Association Kitanoumi estimated that Hakuhō had a possibility of "about 80 percent" of breaking the record, which he would achieve on the eighth day of the November tournament. Hakuhō wrapped up the Aki basho by defeating Harumafuji to achieve his fourth perfect record in a row. This was also his eighth zenshō-yūshō overall, equalling the record held jointly Futabayama and Taihō.

On the first day of the November 2010 tournament, Hakuhō defeated Tochinoshin, tying the consecutive wins record of Tanikaze with 63. However, on the following day his run was finally brought to an end when he was defeated by Kisenosato. This was only the fifth time in his yokozuna career that Hakuhō has been defeated by a maegashira, and Kisenosato is the first to earn more than one kinboshi from him, having previously upset him in September 2008. However, Hakuhō won all his remaining bouts and defeated maegashira Toyonoshima in a playoff to win the championship. He finished the year on 86 wins in regulation matches, equalling the record he set in 2009. At a press conference following his victory, he revealed that having his winning run halted before breaking Futabayama's record affected him so badly that he considered withdrawing from the tournament.

On 21 December he was awarded the Japan Professional Sports Grand Prize, receiving the Prime Minister's Trophy from Naoto Kan.

2011
In the January 2011 tournament in Tokyo he was surprisingly beaten by Kisenosato for the second time in a row but he secured his eighteenth championship on the fourteenth day. In doing so Hakuhō became only the third man after Taihō and Asashōryū to win six consecutive tournaments.

During the May "technical examination tournament" Hakuhō notched up his 500th win in the top division, with a victory over Kitataiki on Day 5. He achieved this total with the loss of just 99 top division bouts since his debut in May 2004 – a winning percentage of 83%. He was defeated by Harumafuji on Day 13 but went on to win his seventh straight championship, equalling Asashōryū's record, despite losing to Kaiō on the final day.

Hakuhō was defeated on the eleventh day of the July 2011 tournament by sekiwake Kotoshōgiku and his quest for a record eighth straight yūshō ended on Day 14 when he was beaten by Harumafuji to drop two wins behind. He also lost his final day match to Baruto to finish on 12–3, his poorest result since January 2010. Nevertheless, it was still enough for runner-up honours, his twelfth.

He was defeated by Kisenosato for the third time in five meetings on Day 12 of the September tournament and then lost to Kotoshōgiku for the second time in a row the following day. However he rallied to beat Baruto on Day 14 and then Harumafuji on the final day to clinch his twentieth tournament championship. On 25 November 2011, he won his 21st tournament title in Fukuoka, moving to 13–0 with none of his rivals scoring better than 10–3. He finished the tournament on 14–1, his only loss coming to Baruto on the final day.

2012
Hakuhō finished second to Baruto in the opening tournament of 2012, losing to Kakuryū, Harumafuji and Kotoōshū. He did however maintain his record of finishing runner-up or better in his last 26 tournaments. In the March basho, Hakuhō won his twenty-second yūshō after beating Kakuryū in a playoff, finishing with a 13–2 record. Hakuhō's only losses came to Kakuryū on the 9th day and Kisenosato on the 13th day. Kakuryū had entered the final day of the tournament one match ahead of the yokozuna but lost to Gōeidō, and Hakuhō beat Baruto to force a playoff. This marked the first time a wrestler had come from one win behind to claim the yūshō on the final day since Asashōryū defeated Hokutōriki in a playoff in May 2004. With this victory Hakuhō drew level with Takanohana in fifth place on the all–time list of most top division tournament championships.

In the May 2012 tournament Hakuhō fractured his left index finger in an opening day loss to Aminishiki, and he dropped further matches to Toyohibiki, Gōeidō and Toyonoshima on Days 7, 8 and 9 to stand at only 5–4 after nine days. However he then won five bouts in a row and was even in with an outside chance of claiming the yūshō until it was announced that Kotoōshū was withdrawing on the final day and giving Tochiōzan an automatic twelfth win. Hakuhō's defeat by Harumafuji on Day 15 meant he finished on 10–5, his worst ever score as a yokozuna and the first time since his debut at the rank, 29 tournaments ago, that he failed to be at least the runner–up.

After losing to Harumafuji on the last day in both the July and September tournaments (as well as maegashira Tochiōzan in September) and seeing his fellow Mongolian claim the yūshō in both and earn promotion to yokozuna himself, Hakuhō came back to win his 23rd championship in November, losing only to Kotoōshū on Day 11. He also finished as the wrestler with the most wins in the calendar year for the sixth consecutive time, a record. His victory was also his sixth straight Kyushu tournament triumph, the best run since Chiyonofuji's record eight in a row from 1981 to 1988.

2013
Hakuhō finished joint runner up on 12–3 in the opening tournament of 2013, giving up a kinboshi to Myōgiryū on Day 3 and also losing to Kotoōshū and Harumafuji. However he captured his 24th title in the Haru basho in March, remaining undefeated for the whole fifteen days. This was his first zenshō-yūshō since his record winning streak of 2010 and also the ninth of his career, breaking the all-time record he had shared with Taihō and Futabayama. It also drew him level with Kitanoumi in fourth place on the list of most career championships, behind only Asashōryū with 25, Chiyonofuji with 31 and Taihō with 32. Hakuhō also recorded his 650th win in the top division in this tournament, moving him into eighth place all-time. In the May tournament he won his 25th championship, equaling Asashōryū's mark. By again recording an undefeated tournament record, his final two victories coming over Kisenosato and Harumafuji, he increased his winning streak to 30 bouts.

Hakuhō extended his streak to 43 bouts by winning his first 13 matches in the Nagoya tournament in July, assuring himself of his 26th tournament victory with two days to spare. He was finally defeated by Kisenosato on Day 14, and also lost to Harumafuji on the final day. He won his fourth tournament in a row, and the 27th of his career, in the Aki basho in September, losing only one bout to Gōeidō. In November he went into a final day showdown with his fellow yokozuna Harumafuji, with both men tied on 13–1. Harumafuji won this bout to claim his sixth championship, with Hakuhō having to settle for his 17th second-place result. He finished the year with 82 wins out of 90 bouts, a record that has only been bettered by himself (twice) and Asashōryū.

2014

Hakuhō won the first tournament of 2014. After going undefeated in his first 14 matches, Hakuhō lost to Kakuryū on the final day. As Kakuryū had a 14–1 record, this prompted the two to again meet in a tie-breaking bout. After losing 20 minutes prior, Hakuhō won his twenty-eighth yūshō by defeating Kakuryū in this tie breaker.

In the March tournament, Hakuhō was bested by Kakuryū and finished runner-up, tied with Gōeidō at 12–3. He returned in May to win his twenty-ninth yūshō with a record of 14–1, only losing once to Gōeidō. He then won his thirtieth yūshō with a 13–2 record in July, becoming only the third man in history to have 30 or more top division championships.

On Day 14 of the September tournament, he defeated the up-and-coming Ichinojō, who he was tied with at 12–1. The following day, Hakuhō clinched the championship, winning his third tournament in a row, and the 31st of his career, having lost only one bout, to Gōeidō. It also drew him level with Chiyonofuji in second place on the list of most career championships.

In the next tournament in Fukuoka, he continued his dominance, again losing only one bout (against Takayasu on day six) and taking the championship to tie him with Taihō for the most championships in sumo history, defeating fellow yokozuna Kakuryū with a yorikiri push-out, for a 14–1 record and his 32nd Emperor's Cup. Hakuhō finally was able to fulfill a promise he had made during a visit to Taihō just two days before his death in January 2013 and equal the record, which had stood for over 40 years. After an emotional presentation ceremony Hakuhō remarked, "I could achieve this accomplishment because the soul of the Japanese and the god of sumo gave a mandate to my efforts".

2015
Hakuhō broke Taihō's record in the opening tournament of 2015, clinching the championship on the 13th day by defeating Kisenosato, and maintaining a perfect score into the final days. Hakuhō finished the tournament with a perfect score of 15–0 while all contenders had at least four losses. Sumo Association chairman Kitanoumi commented, "Nobody can touch Hakuho... I’d like to see him go for 40 titles. If he keeps going the way he is, that’s a possibility." He was however criticized for turning up an hour late to his press conference the next day, having reportedly been out drinking until 7am celebrating his victory.

In Osaka in March Hakuhō won his sixth consecutive championship, a feat only achieved four times previously (twice by Taihō, once by Asashōryū and once by himself). His 36 bout winning streak was brought to an end by Terunofuji on Day 13, but he won all his other matches to finish one ahead of Terunofuji on 14–1. During this tournament he also overtook Chiyonofuji to move into second place on the all-time list of most wins in the top division, behind only Kaiō. In May he lost on the opening day of a tournament for the first time in three years, to Ichinojo. He ended up finishing runner-up to Terunofuji on 11–4, thus ending his hopes of equalling his and Asashōryū's record of seven straight championships. However, he won his 35th title in Nagoya in July, finishing two wins ahead of the rest of the field on 14–1.

In September Hakuhō lost to Okinoumi and Yoshikaze on the first two days, and then announced that he would miss the rest of the tournament owing to an injury which was diagnosed as tendinitis in the left quadriceps. After withdrawing from a tournament for the first time since 2006 Hakuhō said "I couldn’t get any power. I apologize to everyone. I can’t step into the ring with half-hearted feelings". His withdrawal brought to an end his run of 722 consecutive matchdays competing as a yokozuna and 51 consecutive tournaments with a score of 10–5 or better, both records. On his return in November he appeared to be in dominant form and won his first twelve matches, but defeats in the last three days to Harumafuji, Terunofuji and Kakuryū saw him end the tournament in a three-way tie for second place. His most unusual win came on day 10 when he used the rarely-seen nekodamashi ("cat trick") technique to defeat Tochiōzan.

2016
In January 2016 Hakuhō won his first ten matches but then lost to Kotoshōgiku, the eventual winner of the tournament, on Day 11. He also lost his last two bouts to Kisenosato and Harumafuji to end with a 12–3 record and a tie for second place. This result meant he had gone three tournaments without winning the championship for the first time since 2012. In March he lost to Takarafuji on the first day, but won his remaining fourteen matches to take his 36th championship. His win was poorly received as he employed a henka (sidestep at the initial charge) to defeat Harumafuji on the final day and clinch the title. Speaking after the match Hakuhō said that he had never planned to win with a henka "and I feel really bad about that."

On the opening day of the May tournament in Tokyo he equalled Kaiō's record of 879 top division wins, and surpassed it the next day by gaining revenge over Takarafuji who had defeated him in the previous tournament. He secured his 37th championship on the fourteenth day when his only challenger Kisenosato fell to his second loss, and he rounded off the tournament by defeating Kakuryū with a rare backward pivot throw (utchari) to ensure a 29th consecutive victory and a perfect 15–0 record. His winning streak of 33 bouts was brought to an end on the 5th day of the July 2016 tournament when he lost once again to Takarafuji. He finished the tournament with a mediocre 10–5 record, hampered by an injury to his right big toe. He struggled to recover from his injuries and on 8 September he announced that he would miss the whole of the upcoming tournament explaining "I’m sorry to the fans. I want to work on healing in time for the autumn regional tour and the Kyushu Basho".

After undergoing surgery on his toe injury Hakuhō returned to action at the November tournament. On the third day he became only the third wrestler, after Chiyonofuji and Kaiō, to reach 1000 career wins. Afterwards he admitted to nerves having fallen short of his target with a 10–5 record in July and then having to sit out the September tournament, and expressed relief that he was "finally able to do it." Hakuhō went on to get an 11–4 record in November.

2017
In the opening tournament of 2017 Hakuhō lost on Day 8 to maegashira Arawashi (a rare example of him losing to a wrestler he had never fought before) and komusubi Takayasu on Day 9. After being defeated on the last two days by Takanoiwa and tournament winner Kisenosato, he finished in a share for third place. This marked the first time in Hakuhō's yokozuna career that he had gone four tournaments without winning the championship. He pulled out of the March tournament on the fifth day because of toe and thigh injuries.

The May 2017 tournament saw Hakuhō ranked as a yokozuna on the banzuke for the 59th time, putting him level with Chiyonofuji in second place on the all-time list. He won the summer tournament or Natsu Basho, with a zenshō, a perfect 15–0 score. Hakuhō entered the July tournament in Nagoya with two long-standing records in view: he needed nine wins to equal Chiyonofuji's career mark of 1045 and eleven to match Kaiō's all-time record of 1047. His task was made somewhat less challenging when Kakuryū, Kisenosato and Terunofuji withdrew with injuries in the first week. He drew level with Chiyonofuji with a win over Kagayaki on day nine and moved ahead of the late yokozuna by beating Chiyoshoma (a pupil of Chiyonofuji) on the following day. After an upset loss to Mitakeumi on day 11 he recovered to beat Tamawashi and Takayasu to break Kaiō's all-time record. He entered the final day one win ahead of the maegashira 8 Aoiyama and clinched his 39th title with a win over Harumafuji. After receiving his trophy he said "I lost on the 11th day, but the way I turned back the tide after that was in my head so I was able to get on the ring relaxed today. To be able to break Kaio's 1,047 record and Chiyonofuji's 1,045 mark at the same tournament is gratifying. I'd like to go back to my hometown and rest up tomorrow but the thing in my head right now is 1,000 wins in makuuchi."

Hakuhō missed the September 2017 tournament because of a knee injury, meaning three yokozuna were absent from the start of a tournament for the first time since the beginning of the Shōwa era. He said at an exhibition in October that he would like to continue wrestling until the 2020 Summer Olympics which will be held in Tokyo. He returned in November to win the tournament with a 14–1 record. He was the only yokozuna to complete the tournament and secured the yūshō on the fourteenth day when his only challengers, maegashira Hokutofuji and Okinoumi, both lost. Hakuhō's only defeat was to Yoshikaze on Day 11, after which he appealed to the ringside judges to declare the match a false start and initially refused to climb back on the dohyō and accept the loss. Following his 40th career championship Hakuhō commented on his fellow Mongolians Harumafuji and Takanoiwa, who were both absent from the tournament after Harumafuji assaulted Takanoiwa during drinks with other wrestlers in Tottori the previous month, saying "I want Harumafuji and Takanoiwa back in the dohyō." Hakuhō, who was present at the alleged assault, promised to investigators to "tell them exactly what I saw." On 20 December 2017 the Sumo Association announced that he was being docked all of his salary for January 2018, and half for February, for failing to act when Takanoiwa was attacked. Fellow yokozuna Kakuryū was docked just his January pay. The chairman of the Yokozuna Deliberation Council said, "Hakuho and Kakuryu were not able to stop the incident from happening and being taken too far. Their responsibility should not be taken lightly. They should be given a strong warning."

2018
Hakuhō pulled out of the January 2018 tournament on Day 5 after injuring his left big toe in a defeat to Yoshikaze the previous day. He also lost to Hokutofuji on Day 3, the first time he has lost to maegashira ranked wrestlers on consecutive days since his promotion to yokozuna. He was ranked as a yokozuna for the 64th time on the March 2018 banzuke, breaking the previous record of 63 tournaments as a yokozuna held by Kitanoumi. However, his stablemaster announced that he would sit out the tournament because ligament damage in the left big toe required three weeks of recovery time. On 9 April 2018 his father Jigjidiin Mönkhbat died. He returned to competition at the Natsu tournament in May, finishing with an 11–4 record.

He withdrew on Day 4 of the July tournament at the beginning of the day's bouts, due to a right knee injury.

On 22 September 2018, the 14th day of the Aki Basho, Hakuhō created history by winning his 41st Emperor's Cup and scoring his 1000th victory in sumo's top makuuchi division. The following day he completed the tournament undefeated, the 14th time he had achieved a zensho-yusho, extending his own record. His victory also meant he had won at least one top division championship for 13 consecutive years, beating the previous record of 12 held by Taihō.

He withdrew from the regional tour following the September tournament because of a recurrence of his right knee injury and underwent surgery on 18 October. He confirmed on 8 November that he was withdrawing from the November tournament because of persistent pain in the knee. This is the first year since 2006 that he has won only one tournament in a calendar year.

2019
Hakuhō won his first ten matches in January 2019, but then lost three in a row to Mitakeumi, Tamawashi and Takakeishō. He withdrew from the tournament on Day 14, with his stablemaster revealing that Hakuhō injured his right knee on Day 4 and his left ankle on Day 5. It was his 11th career withdrawal, and his fifth in the last seven tournaments.

At the March 2019 tournament, which was the last in the Heisei era, Hakuhō won his 42nd top division yūshō with a perfect 15–0 record, his 15th zenshō-yūshō of his career. He sealed his perfect record with a hard-fought shitatenage victory over Kakuryū on the final day. Interviewed after his triumph he said "I entered sumo at the tournament in Osaka, and now I’m here as we ring out the end of the Heisei era, so Osaka has a special place in my heart. I am a creature of this era. Nine years ago in Nagoya, I received a letter from the emperor. This Heisei era means everything to me." Despite appearing to be in pain from an arm injury he then led the crowd in a tejime, a clapping ceremony to mark the end of the era. This was seen as a breach of etiquette as the tournament ceremonies had not yet concluded, and after criticism by the Yokozuna Deliberation Council Hakuhō and his stablemaster apologized to the Sumo Association. Hakuho was issued an official reprimand by the Sumo Association the following month for his actions.

Hakuhō revealed on 31 March that the injury suffered in the March tournament was a muscle tear in his upper right arm, and that he had opted for rest rather than surgery. He only performed the yokozuna dohyo-iri ceremony during the spring tour, and on 9 May his stablemaster confirmed that he would be sitting out the Natsu tournament as he had only begun basic training routines. He resumed full training at the beginning of June, and shortly before the Nagoya tournament declared himself fit to enter.

In the July tournament Hakuhō was defeated by Ichinojō and Kotoshōgiku but still had a chance to force a playoff on the final day against Kakuryū, who led him 13–1 to 12–2 on the leaderboard. However Kakuryū won the match, his third victory over Hakuhō in their last five meetings, and Hakuhō finished as runner-up alongside maegashira Terutsuyoshi. It was his first runner-up performance since January 2016. He withdrew from the September 2019 tournament on the second day with a fractured finger. He returned in November 2019 and won the tournament with a 14–1 record, three wins ahead of the rest of the field. He told reporters after the tournament that he had feared he might never win another title, as his doctor had warned his March arm injury might never completely heal. He also said he was aiming for 50 championships before retiring.

In December Hakuhō was nominated by Sumida, one of Tokyo's wards, to be a torchbearer for the 2020 Olympics.

2020
Hakuhō withdrew from Day 4 of the January 2020 tournament, with his stablemaster citing a fever and inflammation of his lower back. He had suffered consecutive defeats to maegashira Endō and Myōgiryū. Having pulled out of four tournaments in 2018 and three in 2019, he has not completed two tournaments in a row since May and July 2017.

At the March 2020 tournament, Hakuhō won his 44th top division yūshō with a 13–2 record. On the last day he faced fellow yokozuna Kakuryū with both having a 12–2 score, the first time in seven years that two yokozuna had faced each other in the final match of the tournament with an identical record. His victory took place in a virtually empty arena due to the COVID-19 pandemic, the first time since 1945 that a tournament had been held without paying spectators.

Hakuho withdrew from the July tournament due to an injury sustained to his right knee late in the tournament; he subsequently had endoscopic surgery on the knee and missed both the September and November tournaments as a result, the first time since his debut that he has missed two consecutive tournaments.

Following the November 2020 basho, Hakuhō - along with fellow yokozuna Kakuryū - were issued warnings by the Sumo Association's Yokozuna Deliberation Council due to lack of participation in recent sumo tournaments. This is the middle of three notices that the council can issue between a letter of encouragement and a recommendation for retirement. It is the first time in history that warning notices have been issued.

2021
The Sumo Association announced on 5 January 2021 that Hakuhō tested positive for COVID-19. He had reported a loss of the sense of smell the day before. The news broke with just five days until the scheduled start of the January 2021 Tournament. Therefore he was absent from the tournament. Hakuhō left hospital on 14 January to continue his recovery at home. The whole of the Miyagino stable also sat out the tournament.

Upon the release of the March 2021 banzuke Hakuhō became the first wrestler to spend 100 straight tournaments in makuuchi from his top division debut (without ever falling to jūryō).

After winning his first two bouts of the March tournament, Hakuhō withdrew after doctors informed him that he needed surgery on his right kneecap requiring approximately two months of rehabilitation, meaning that Hakuhō would miss the May 2021 basho. Miyagino Oyakata said that Hakuhō would decide whether or not to continue competing based on his results in the July tournament. He underwent endoscopic surgery on 19 March. This was same knee that had also been operated on in August of the previous year.

On 29 March, the Yokozuna Deliberation Council upheld the warning that was first issued to Hakuhō following the November 2020 tournament. The council announced it would revisit the issue at the end of the July 2021 tournament, which Hakuho referred to as "make or break" for his continued participation in active competition.

Following the retirement of Kakuryū, Hakuho was the sole yokozuna listed on the May 2021 banzuke. This marked the first time since September 2012 that there was only one active yokozuna, and uniquely, Hakuhō was also the sole yokozuna on that occasion. He formally withdrew from the May tournament on May 7, due to his knee surgery, making it the sixth straight tournament he would fail to complete.

Mounting a comeback in July 2021, Hakuhō went undefeated for the first 14 days of the competition and faced ōzeki Terunofuji, who was also undefeated and vying for yokozuna promotion, in the final match of the tournament. Hakuhō defeated Terunofuji to win his 45th top division championship and secure his 16th zenshō. Hakuhō expressed relief after the match, saying that he did not expect to win the basho with a perfect record at his age. His yūshō win at the age of 36 years and four months surpassed that of fellow yokozuna Chiyonofuji, who won his final championship at 35 years and five months. Speaking to reporters the next day, Hakuhō said, "The prospect for retirement was looming large, right before me, so I fired myself up more than before."

Hakuhō did not take part in practice sessions for the September 2021 tournament and gave no indication that he was ready to compete. In the event he was withdrawn from the tournament along with the rest of Miyagino stable after two wrestlers tested positive for COVID-19. It was the second time in 2021 that the stable had to withdraw from a basho because of a coronavirus outbreak.

Retirement
Reports emerged after the September 2021 tournament that Hakuhō intended to retire, with his long-standing knee injuries leading him to believe he could no longer complete a 15 day tournament. Japan Sumo Association board member Shibatayama confirmed that Hakuhō's retirement papers had been received on 27 September, and that a meeting would be scheduled to approve Hakuhō's acquisition of the Magaki elder stock, which Hakuhō had discussed his hopes to acquire back in March 2021. In April 2021 a committee outside of the Sumo Association had declared that the ichidai-toshiyori system, in which exceptional yokozuna are given special one-generation elder status and allowed them to keep their shikona after retirement, did not in fact exist. This was controversial as it was seen to be aimed at Hakuhō, who would have been the first wrestler since Takanohana in 2003 to be given the honour.

The Sumo Association's Board of Directors officially finalized Hakuhō's retirement on 30 September.  Unusually, before approving Hakuhō's acquisition of the Magaki stock the Sumo Association required him to sign a pledge that he would carry out the duties of an elder and that he would not act in ways that went against the "spirit of the way of sumo." At a press conference held the following day, Hakuhō told reporters that he was filled with a sense of relief. He said that he had made the decision to retire after achieving double-digit wins at the July tournament in Nagoya, and waited for the right time because of several factors, including Terunofuji's promotion to yokozuna, the Tokyo Olympic and Paralympic Games, and the COVID-19 outbreak that prevented his stable from competing in the September basho. He was assigned to the guidance dissemination department of the Sumo Association, until the division of duties was decided again in February 2022. When the banzuke for the November 2021 tournament in Fukuoaka was released, there were only 41 wrestlers in the top division instead of the usual 42. Hakuhō's retirement announcement on September 30 had come after the banzuke committee meeting to draw up the new rankings, but an extra wrestler from jūryō was not promoted and instead Hakuhō's name was effectively blanked out from the yokozuna spot he would have occupied. Hakuhō was seen at this tournament in the Sumo Association's blue security uniform, as it is the sumo custom for new oyakata to start out as a tournament security guard.

Although there had been speculation that he was intending to open a stable of his own in Tokyo,  Hakuhō remained at Miyagino stable, and on 28 July 2022 the Sumo Association announced that he had inherited the Miyagino elder stock and would become the  head coach of the stable, as the then Miyagino-oyakata (former Chikubayama) would reach the mandatory retirement age of 65 in August 2022. The two swapped elder names, with the former Miyagino becoming Magaki Oyakata and staying on as a consultant. Hakuhō had already recruited several wrestlers himself while still an active wrestler, including former maegashira , popular lightweight Enhō, and the 200 cm Mongolian-born Hokuseihō. It was announced after the January 2023 tournament that Miyagino stable's Ochiai had been promoted to jūryō just one tournament after making his professional debut as a makushita tsukedashi entrant. Hakuhō said Ochiai's rise had been so fast he had not yet had time to think of an official shikona for him.

Hakuhō's danpatsu-shiki (retirement ceremony) was held at the Ryōgoku Kokugikan on 28 January 2023. Billed as "The Retirement Ceremony of Hakuho Sho and the Succession of the Name Miyagino" (白鵬引退宮城野襲名披露) when it was announced in September 2022, Hakuhō viewed the ceremony as repaying the fans that had supported him ever since his retirement. Accompanied by ōzeki Takakeishō and sekiwake Hōshōryū, serving as the tachimochi (sword bearer) and tsuyuharai (dew sweeper) respectively, Hakuhō performed his last yokozuna dohyō-iri, or ring entering ceremony. About 300 people took turns to cut the ōichōmage bun, with former Miyagino stablemaster Chikubayama making the final cut.

Fighting style
Hakuhō had a straightforward but effective style, reminiscent of yokozuna Takanohana. He has been called the "quintessential all-round sumo wrestler" because of his strength in both grappling and pushing techniques, and his ability to read and respond to his opponent's intentions. However, he said he did not have a special or favourite kimarite, and that "the only thing I am very good at is yorikiri (force-out)". This technique, the most common kimarite in sumo, was used by Hakuhō to win 28% of his matches. He favoured the migi-yotsu position, meaning his right hand was inside and his left hand outside his opponent's arms, and he became famous for his left hand outside grip. He also regularly employed uwate-nage, or outer-arm throw. While meeting foreign journalists in April 2009, Hakuhō said he was studying the techniques of the 35th yokozuna Futabayama, a wrestler whom he greatly admires, in particular his go-no-sen approach to the tachi-ai or initial charge. He also tried to use Wakanohana I's trademark move of yobimodoshi, or pulling body slam, in his own bouts.

Hakuhō was criticized for giving his opponents an unnecessary final shove after the bout was already over (dameoshi). He did this on Day 4 of the March 2016 tournament in his win over Okinoumi and again on Day 8, when he sent Yoshikaze crashing into the ring side judge Izutzu Oyakata, fracturing Izutzu's left femur and putting him out of action for three months. Hakuhō was warned by the head of the judging committee, Isegahama Oyakata, who said, "he has to understand completely that (such) redundant finishing blows are dangerous." Hakuhō apologized, calling his actions "inexcusable... Even I have weaknesses in the ring that I want to correct." Speaking after his tournament victory in May 2016 he commented, "I don’t know why but when I get into the ring, I turn into a different Hakuho. I think there are two Hakuhos. I'm gentler when I'm not in the ring."

The Yokozuna Deliberation Council criticized him in January 2018 for using slaps to the face (harite) and leading with the forearm and elbow (kachiage) at the tachi-ai, moves they considered beneath the dignity of a yokozuna. Hakuhō continued to use these tactics, however, and was condemned once again by the Council after his championship-clinching win over Terunofuji in July 2021. Hakuho responded to criticism of his style in this match and in the previous day's win over Shōdai, in which he stood far back at the tachi-ai and kept his distance throughout the match, by saying he was trying to protect his weak right knee.

Personal life
In February 2007 Hakuhō married Sayoko Wada, then 22 years old, a Japanese university student and glamour model, after a three-year relationship. The wedding ceremony took place at Meiji Shrine. The couple have four children.

In July 2017 he was reported to be considering taking Japanese citizenship, which is required to stay in the Japan Sumo Association as an elder after retirement. This would involve giving up Mongolian citizenship, which Hakuhō was reportedly reluctant to do while his father Jigjidiin Mönkhbat was still living. After Mönkhbat's death in April 2018 Hakuhō's mother denied that her husband had been opposed to the idea and said she felt Hakuhō's change in nationality was inevitable. It was reported in April 2019 that Hakuhō had begun the process by applying for renunciation of his Mongolian citizenship, and he announced in September 2019 that he had acquired Japanese citizenship. He chose to change his legal name to his shikona, Hakuhō Shō.

Other activities
Since 2011 Hakuhō has hosted the Hakuhō Cup, an annual amateur sumo event for elementary to middle school children from both inside and outside Japan, held at the Ryōgoku Kokugikan.

List of records

On 4 December 2021 Hakuhō was recognized by Guinness World Records for the following records:

Most top division championships: 45
Most career wins: 1187
Most top division wins: 1093
Most undefeated championships: 16
Most tournaments ranked as yokozuna: 84

Hakuhō also holds a number of other records, such as most wins as yokozuna (899), most consecutive wins in the 6 tournaments per year era  (63, absolute record is 69) and most wins in a calendar year (86, achieved twice). In October 2022 he set the Guinness World Record for creating 104 tegata hand prints in one minute.

Career record

See also
List of yokozuna
List of sumo tournament top division champions
List of sumo tournament top division runners-up
List of sumo tournament second division champions
Glossary of sumo terms
List of past sumo wrestlers
List of sumo record holders
List of sumo elders
List of non-Japanese sumo wrestlers

References

External links

Hakuhō Cup official website

1985 births
Living people
Mongolian emigrants to Japan
Mongolian sumo wrestlers
Japanese sumo wrestlers
Naturalized citizens of Japan
Sportspeople from Ulaanbaatar
Tibetan Buddhists from Mongolia
Yokozuna
World record holders